American Coaster Enthusiasts (ACE) is a non-profit organization focusing on the enjoyment, knowledge, and preservation of roller coasters as well as recognition of some as architectural and engineering landmarks. Dues-paying members receive the quarterly magazine RollerCoaster! and bi-monthly newsletter ACE News. Amusement parks have also invited members to exclusive ride events at amusement parks as well as sneak peek events at new roller coasters under construction.

The organization maintains an online database of roller coasters  including ride specifications and archives of published news articles. The club also recognizes historically significant roller coasters with the Coaster Classic and ACE Coaster Landmark statuses.

History 
Organization founders Roy Brashears, Paul Greenwald and Richard Munch met at a roller coaster riding marathon event promoting the 1977 movie Rollercoaster at the Rebel Yell roller coaster (now called Racer 75) at Kings Dominion amusement park in Doswell, Virginia. The three discovered they shared the same passion for roller coasters and decided to form a club that would allow others that shared the same interests to join. They organized Coaster ConI the following year at Busch Gardens Williamsburg theme park in June 1978. On the final day of the event during a business meeting, the name American Coaster Enthusiasts (ACE) was chosen as the club's name. Coaster Con events have been held annually ever since.

Structure 
The organization is almost entirely run by volunteers, with the exception of an independent contractor who runs certain day-to-day operations regarding mailings, receipt of event payment/membership dues and merchandise. ACE members are required to pay annual membership dues that are available in individual, couple, family and corporate packages. The organization fulfills one of its primary goals of providing education through its publications. Other goals include promoting the conservation, appreciation, and enjoyment of roller coasters and their place in history as architectural and engineering landmarks.

ACE is governed by an executive committee of five officers and seven directors. Four of the officer positions are directly elected and one indirectly elected by the club's membership. These officers are the President, Vice President, Treasurer, Secretary and Immediate Past President. The seven directors are appointed by the president and approved by a majority vote of the remaining officers. The Region Director, oversees a system of ACE regions, which sponsors events and publishes regional websites and email newsletters.

ACE Regions
 California Northern
 Canada (except British Columbia)
 Eastern Great Lakes (Ohio and Michigan)
 Europe
 Florida
 Heart of America (Arkansas, Kansas, Missouri and southern Illinois)
 Mid-Atlantic (Delaware, District of Columbia, Maryland and Virginia)
 Midwest (Indiana, Kentucky, West Virginia)
 New England (Connecticut, Massachusetts, Maine, New Hampshire, Rhode Island and Vermont)
 New Jersey
 New York
 North Central (Iowa, Minnesota, North Dakota, Nebraska, South Dakota)
 Northwest (Alaska, British Columbia, Idaho, Montana, Oregon, Washington)
 Other Countries
 Pacific Southwest (Arizona, Hawaii, Nevada and southern California)
 Pennsylvania Eastern
 Pennsylvania Western
 Rocky Mountain (Colorado, New Mexico, Utah and Wyoming)
 South America
 South Central (Louisiana, Oklahoma and Texas)
 Southeast (Alabama, Georgia, Mississippi, North Carolina, South Carolina and Tennessee)
 Western Great Lakes (Wisconsin and northern Illinois)

Events 
The national organization sponsors the annual Coaster Con convention, international tours, seasonal conferences, and a conference focused on coaster preservation.

Coaster Con 
Coaster Con, usually features one to as many as six theme parks where exclusive ride time is made available to members on selected coasters outside of times when the park is open to the public. Coaster Con also features photo and video contests, carnival games competitions, as well as an annual business meeting, banquet (with presentations, awards, industry keynote speaker, and auction to benefit ACE's funds), workshops, discussion groups, displays, and memorabilia sales tables.

*Note: These events were delayed one full year due to COVID-19. A virtual Coaster Con known as "Coaster Con at Home" was held on the same dates.

Awards

ACE Coaster Classics 
The ACE Coaster Classic award was developed during a period when changes in the design, equipping, and operation of wood coasters threatened to erase these time-honored experiences and rituals. The award is designed to recognize coasters that still adhere to these principles while allowing riders to safely experience the thrill of the classic wooden roller coaster ride. To be eligible for ACE Coaster Classic status, the coaster must meet the following criteria:
 Traditional lap bars that allow riders to experience so-called airtime, or negative G's, the sensation of floating above the seat, must be installed. Individual, ratcheting lap bars do not meet this requirement.
 Riders must be able to slide from side-to-side in their seats. A coaster with any restraint or device that restricts this freedom, like seat dividers between riders, does not meet this requirement.
 Riders must be able to view upcoming drops and thrills. A coaster with headrests on every seat or the majority of seats that restrict this view does not meet this requirement.
 Riders must be free to choose where they sit. A coaster where riders are assigned seats before boarding does not meet this requirement.

The amusement park or theme park operating a coaster that is recognized as a Coaster Classic is usually presented a custom plaque. The plaque typically states:

It has been noted, however, that most coasters usually have disqualifying ratcheting lap bars, seat dividers and headrests to prevent people from trying to stand up during the ride. For example, Rolling Thunder at Six Flags Great Adventure had buzz bars which meet traditional lap bar Coaster Classic requirements, but it is not a classic because of headrests and seat dividers being added in 1981 to prevent people from standing up during the ride.

Coasters awarded 

Rescinded awards 
Another 13 coasters were awarded ACE Coaster Classic status; 12 in North America and one in Europe. However, due to subsequent changes to the coasters, the awards have been rescinded.

Coaster Landmark 
In 2002, ACE introduced the Roller Coaster Landmark program to recognize coasters of historic significance that may or may not qualify for ACE Coaster Classic status.

Golden Age Coaster 
The Golden Age Coaster award, a prequel to the Roller Coaster Landmark award, was established to recognize significant roller coasters that were built during the 1920s. Giant Dipper at Santa Cruz Beach Boardwalk, and Giant Dipper at Belmont Park (San Diego) both received the Golden Age Coaster award in addition to the Roller Coaster Landmark award.

Preservation 
ACE takes an active role in the preservation of endangered roller coasters. Since 1985, the club has either directly or indirectly helped save more than half a dozen. One of the most notable include the Phoenix located at Knoebels Amusement Resort in Elysburg, Pennsylvania. The wooden coaster was relocated from Playland Park in San Antonio, Texas. Another that the organization saved was Leap the Dips, the world's oldest operating roller coaster, located at Lakemont Park in Altoona, Pennsylvania. In addition to preservation, some parks have also sought the opinions of ACE members regarding roller coaster installations, such as Magnum XL-200 at Cedar Point and roller coaster design, as was the case with The Legend and The Voyage at Holiday World in Santa Claus, Indiana.

References

External links

 American Coaster Enthusiasts (ACE) (Official website)

Clubs and societies in the United States
Roller coasters
1978 establishments in the United States
Grand Prairie, Texas